Rúben Ismael Valente Ramos, known as Ismael (born 25 March 1999) is a Portuguese professional footballer who plays for Nacional on loan from Moreirense as a midfielder.

Football career
On 13 September 2020, Ismael made his professional debut with Mafra in a Liga Portugal 2 match against Cova da Piedade.

On 23 January 2023, Ismael joined Nacional on loan until the end of the 2022–23 season.

References

External links

Stats and profile at LPFP 

1999 births
Sportspeople from Aveiro District
Living people
Portuguese footballers
Association football midfielders
Moreirense F.C. players
F.C. Felgueiras 1932 players
C.D. Mafra players
C.D. Nacional players
Primeira Liga players
Liga Portugal 2 players
Campeonato de Portugal (league) players